The term fedayee was originally used during the Armenian national movement of late 19th and early 20th centuries, but it was also used to refer to the Armenian irregular forces in the early 1990s when the dispute with Azerbaijan over Nagorno-Karabakh was turning into the First Nagorno-Karabakh War.

Role 
According to some estimates, the detachments played one of the decisive roles in the victory of the Armenian army, as they were the main force that fought in the first years of the war. These volunteer units ended up forming the basis for the Armed Forces of Armenia.

List 
Here is a list of the major Armenian volunteer detachments during the First Nagorno-Karabakh War.

References

Military units and formations of the First Nagorno-Karabakh War
Armenian militant groups